SM Quiapo (also known as SM Clearance Outlet and SM Carriedo) is the first SM Store opened in November 1972. The store is owned by Chinese-Filipino billionaire Henry Sy and currently being managed by the SM Group's foundation, SM Department Store Inc. The store has been renovated and relaunched as SM Clearance Store.

History
Henry Sy established shoe stores in Manila which were Plaza, Paris and Park Avenue which started with letter "P" prior to establishing the store that would be known as SM Quiapo. In 1958, he established a shoe store in Carriedo, Manila, which he named Shoemart after he was not able to come up with a name starting in "P".

The store was later expanded and began to sell clothes and accessories aside from just shoes. In 1972, Shoemart was expanded and became the first SM Department Store.

See also
SM City North EDSA
SM City Manila
SM City San Lazaro

References

Buildings and structures in Quiapo, Manila
Department store buildings in the Philippines
SM Prime
Shopping malls established in 1958